Guangyang may refer to:

Guangyang District (广阳区), Langfang, Hebei, China
Guangyang Commandery (廣陽郡), a historical region in North China
Guangyang Secondary School (光洋中学), government secondary school in Singapore

Towns (广阳镇) in China
Guangyang, Chongqing, in Nan'an District
Guangyang, Fangcheng County, in Fangcheng County, Henan
Guangyang, Tongchuan, in Yintai District, Tongchuan, Shaanxi